Andreas Decker (born 19 August 1952) is a German rower who competed for East Germany in the 1976 Summer Olympics and in the 1980 Summer Olympics.

He was born in Zwickau. In 1976 he won the gold medal as crew member of the East German boat in the coxless fours competition. Four years later he won his second gold medal with the East German boat in the coxless four event.

References

External links
 

1952 births
Living people
People from Zwickau
People from Bezirk Karl-Marx-Stadt
East German male rowers
Sportspeople from Saxony
Olympic rowers of East Germany
Rowers at the 1976 Summer Olympics
Rowers at the 1980 Summer Olympics
Olympic gold medalists for East Germany
Olympic medalists in rowing
World Rowing Championships medalists for East Germany
Medalists at the 1980 Summer Olympics
Medalists at the 1976 Summer Olympics
Recipients of the Patriotic Order of Merit in gold
European Rowing Championships medalists